Kiçikli is a village in the municipality of Üçoğlan in the Agdam Rayon of Azerbaijan.

References

Populated places in Aghdam District